Polonynian Beskids or Polonyne Beskids is a geological group of mountain ranges of the Eastern Beskids, within the Outer Eastern Carpathians. It is one of two parallel mountain ridges of the Eastern Beskids, situated in western parts of modern Ukraine. They are stretching parallel to the Wooded Beskids on the northeast, and Vihorlat-Gutin Area to the southwest.

The name of this mountain range is derived from Slavic term polonyna, designating a particular type of montane meadows, characteristic for those parts of the Carpathians. Thus, the very term polonyne or polonynian Beskids translates as Meadowed Beskids. In Polish and Ukrainian terminology, this range is most commonly called the "Polonynian Beskids", while in Slovakia it is also defined in a much wider sense, under the local term Poloniny. The territorial scope of all those terms varies in accordance to different classifications and traditions.

Subdivisions 

Polonynian Beskids include:

 Smooth Polonyna (PL: Połonina Równa; UK: Полонина Рівна) → c6
 Polonyna Borzhava (PL: Połonina Borżawska; UK: Полонина Боржава) → c7
 Polonyna Kuk (PL: Połonina Kuk; UK: Полонина Кук) → c8
 Red Polonyna (PL: Połonina Czerwona; UK: Полонина Красна)→ c9
 Svydovets (PL: Świdowiec; UK: Свидівець) → c10
 Chornohora (PL: Czarnohora; UK: Чорногора) → c11
 Hrynyavy Mountains (PL: Połoniny Hryniawskie; UK: Гриняви) → c12

See also

 Divisions of the Carpathians
 Wooded Carpathians
 Ukrainian Carpathians
 Polonyna (montane meadow)

References

Sources

External links

 Encyclopedia of Ukraine: Beskyds
 Encyclopedia of Ukraine: Inner Carpathian Valley
 Encyclopedia of Ukraine: Volcanic Ukrainian Carpathians
 Encyclopedia of Ukraine: Borzhava
 Encyclopedia of Ukraine: Krasna
 Encyclopedia of Ukraine: Svydivets
 Encyclopedia of Ukraine: Chornohora
 Carpathian Mountains: Division (map)

Mountain ranges of the Eastern Carpathians
Mountain ranges of Ukraine